Light Made Lighter is the second album by American jazz pianist Craig Taborn,  which was released in 2001 on Thirsty Ear's Blue Series.

Recording and reception

The album was recorded in October 2001.

In his review for AllMusic, Thom Jurek states "This is one of the best records in Thirsty Ear's 'Blue' series thus far, and, more importantly, it reveals to American audiences what a monster Taborn really is as a pianist." The Penguin Guide to Jazz says "There are hints of nursery rhyme and calipso on the opening track which suggest a certain personal resonance, and which inevitably recalls some of Andrew Hill's Caribbean stuff, but elsewhere the tone is more sombre."

Track listing
All compositions by Craig Taborn except as indicated
 "Bodies We Came Out Of" – 4:57
 "St. Ride" – 2:03 
 "I Cover the Waterfront" (Johnny Green) – 3:09
 "Crocodile" – 6:44
 "Light Made Lighter" – 5:24
 "Whiskey Warm" – 2:57
 "Morning Creatures" – 2:26
 "St. Ranglehold" – 2:56
 "American Landscape" – 4:22
 "Light Made Lighter - Piano" – 1:57
 "Bodies We Came Out Of - Part two" – 3:39

Personnel
Craig Taborn – piano
Chris Lightcap – bass
Gerald Cleaver - drums

References

2001 albums
Craig Taborn albums
Thirsty Ear Recordings albums